The SWCW Southwest Brass Knuckles Championship was a short-lived secondary title in Southwest Championship Wrestling. It lasted from 1981 until about 1983.

Title history

Footnotes

References

External links
 SWCW Southwest Brass Knuckles title history

Southwest Brass Knuckles Championship
Hardcore wrestling championships
Regional professional wrestling championships